Haz or HAZ may refer to:

People 
 Hamzah Haz (born 1940), Indonesian journalist and politician, ninth Vice President of Indonesia
 Mark Hazinski (born 1985), American table tennis player

Other uses 
 Haz, Yemen
 Hannoversche Allgemeine Zeitung, a German newspaper
 Hazaragi dialect of Persian spoken in Afghanistan
 Hazardous material
 Hazel Grove railway station, in England
 Hazlehurst station, in Mississippi, United States
 Heat-affected zone in welding